Purushottam (English: The best among men) is a 1992 Indian Bengali action drama film starring Prosenjeet, Debashree Roy in the lead roles. The film was produced and directed by Prosenjit himself in his directional debut and has a musical score by R. D. Burman.

Prosenjeet played the protagonist, Deepak a.k.a. Badshah, while Debashree Roy plays his love interest Namita. Prosenjeet Chatterjee often mentions the film to be one of those memorable films of his career.

Plot 
Dipak, having completed his B. A. course, decides to pursue higher studies, contrary to his father's wishes. His friends ask him to stand for elections much to the anger of Sunil, a member of the opposition party and son of the area M.L.A. After refusing to withdraw his name from the candidates list, Sunil and others torment Dipak. They kill his father and he is separated from his girlfriend Namita who later marries Alok, a police officer. The rest of the film depicts the fight of Dipak against his enemies in order to lead a peaceful life.

Cast 
 Prosenjeet as Deepak / Badshah
 Debashree Roy as Namita
 Shubhendu Chatterjee
 Kali Banerjee
 Dipankar Dey
 Abhishek Chatterjee
 Pradip Mukherjee
 Pallavi Chatterjee
 Uttam Mohanty 
 Hara Patnaik

Soundtrack

Tracks

See also 
 Amar Sangee - A 1987 film starring Prosenjit Chatterjee often considered to be his breakthrough in the Bengali Film Industry.
 Aami Sei Meye - A 1998 film written and directed by Prosenjit Chatterjee.
 Sasurbari Zindabad - A successful Bengali film released in 2000 featuring Prosenjit Chatterjee in the lead role.

References

External links 

Bengali-language Indian films
1992 directorial debut films
1992 films
1990s Bengali-language films